The 1989 Refuge Assurance League was the twenty-first competing of what was generally known as the Sunday League.  The competition was won for the third time by Lancashire County Cricket Club.

Standings

Batting averages

Bowling averages

Refuge Assurance Cup

Following the end of the Sunday League season, the top four teams in the Sunday League competed for the Refuge Assurance Cup. Essex emerged as victors, defeating Nottinghamshire in the final.

See also
Sunday League

References

Refuge
Pro40